John Duns may refer to:
 John Duns  Scotus (c. 1265/66–1308), Scottish Catholic priest and Franciscan friar, university professor, philosopher, and theologian
 John Duns (minister) (1820–1909), Scottish minister and academic